is a railway station in the town of Tatsuno Town, Kamiina District, Nagano Prefecture, Japan, operated by East Japan Railway Company (JR East).

Lines
Ono Station is served by the old route of Chūō Main Line  (Okaya-Shiojiri branch)  and is 17.8 kilometers from the branching point of the line at Okaya Station and 228.2 from the terminus at Tokyo Station.

Station layout
The station consists of two opposed ground-level side platforms connected by a footbridge. The station is a  Kan'i itaku station.

Platforms

History
Ono Station opened on 6 June 1906.  With the privatization of Japanese National Railways (JNR) on 1 April 1987, the station came under the control of JR East.

Passenger statistics
In fiscal 2017, the JR East portion of the  station was used by an average of 143 passengers daily (boarding passengers only).

Surrounding area

Ono Jinja

See also
 List of railway stations in Japan

References

External links

 JR East station information 

Railway stations in Nagano Prefecture
Chūō Main Line
Railway stations in Japan opened in 1906
Stations of East Japan Railway Company
Tatsuno, Nagano